The Happy Valley Ground is a cricket ground, in Episkopi, Cyprus.

In October 2021, the ground was the venue for the 2021 Cyprus T20I Cup which involved Cyprus team  along with Isle of Man and Estonia. Cyprus and Estonia played a two-match bilateral series on 5 October, which was the first official Twenty20 International (T20I) matches for both sides, before the tri-nation Cyprus T20I Cup starting on 6 October.

References

External links 
 CricHQ

Cricket grounds in Cyprus
Sports venues in Cyprus